Johannes Malefetsane Fetsi "Chippa" Molatedi (born 6 July 1960) is a retired South African football (soccer) midfielder who played Moroka Swallows, Kaizer Chiefs, Seven Stars and D'Alberton Callies.

Career
Molatedi began playing for Swallows in January 1981. After he won the Mainstay Cup in 1983 he requested a transfer to the club he supported as a boy, Kaizer Chiefs.

With an increasing number of enemies and death threats, he was flown to the coast in Durban by Kaizer Motaung, who arranged for him a unit at Elangeni Hotel where he stayed for 3 weeks. Motaung struck a record deal with a transfer fee of R45 000.

He played for Chiefs for ten seasons giving defenders headaches with Trevor Mthimkhulu where he won the quadruple in 1984.

His most memorable match would be the Mainstay Cup semi final against African Wanderers where came on as a substitute in the second half trailing 1-0 at Ellis Park. Molatedi attended his grandmother's funeral earlier that day and scored a hat trick to win 3-1.

Retirement
Molatedi's injury in 1987 changed his game drastically, he would rush and never waited for his recovery. At Seven Stars his star began to wane and retired in 2000. He coached amateur teams in Matatiele and returned to Johannesburg in 2002. He runs the Ormonde Soccer Academy with players from Xavier Reef and Ormonde View.

Personal life
He married Rose in 1980. He lives in Ormonde.

References

1960 births
Living people
Association football midfielders
South African soccer players
Kaizer Chiefs F.C. players
Place of birth missing (living people)
Moroka Swallows F.C. players